Cyperus micrantherus is a species of sedge that is endemic to Madagascar.

The species was first formally described by the botanist Henri Chermezon in 1921.

See also
 List of Cyperus species

References

micrantherus
Taxa named by Henri Chermezon
Plants described in 1921
Endemic flora of Madagascar